Grass tree, grass-tree or grasstree may refer to several plant species, including:

Plants
Dasylirion longissimum (family: Asparagaceae), known as the Mexican Grass Tree
Dracophyllum (family: Ericaceae), a genus of about 100 species sometimes known as grass-trees
Kingia australis (family: Dasypogonaceae), a monotypic genus from Southwest Australia
Richea pandanifolia (family: Ericaceae), known as the Giant Grass Tree
Xanthorrhoea (family: Asphodelaceae), a genus of about 30 species endemic to Australia, commonly called grasstrees

Places
Grasstree railway station, New South Wales, Australia
Grasstree, Queensland, a town in Australia
Grasstree Beach, a locality in Queensland, Australia